Resaca may refer to:

Resaca (channel), a geographical feature in the Rio Grande basin, Texas, United States
 Resaca, Georgia, a city in Gordon County, Georgia, United States
 Resaca, Ohio, an unincorporated community in Madison County, Ohio, United States
 Battle of Resaca, a battle of the American Civil War fought in Georgia in May 1864
Battle of Resaca de la Palma, a battle of the Mexican–American War fought in Texas in 1846
USS Resaca (1865), an American navy ship
 Resaca, Spanish for hangover
 Resaca (film) a film by Alberto Santana, earliest sound film in Cinema of Peru

See also